Shanthi Feeds Limited is an Indian multinational food products company headquartered in Coimbatore, India. The company was started in 1988 and is involved in broiler farming, hatcheries, feed mills for poultry and cattle, farming of soya, corn and wind energy projects. It markets and exports broiler chicken, frozen chicken, chicken eggs. The company has a production capacity of nearly 47 Million birds per annum.

References

Animal feed companies of India
Food and drink companies of India
Poultry companies
Companies based in Coimbatore
1988 establishments in Tamil Nadu
Indian companies established in 1988
Poultry industry in India
Agriculture companies of India